Ysmael may refer to:

Ysmael R. Villegas (1924–1945), Mexican-American Medal of Honor recipient
Ysmael Steel Admirals, basketball team located in Manila, Philippines from 1958 to 1968

See also
 Ismael (disambiguation)
 Ismaël
 Isfael, Welsh bishop and saint
 Ishmael (disambiguation)
 Ismail (disambiguation)
 Ismail (name)